Martin Bourke may refer to:
 Martin Bourke (born 1947), British diplomat, governor of the Turks and Caicos Islands
 Martin Bourke (born 1936), Australian rules footballer
 Martin Bourke (1867–1939), American lawyer and politician from New York